Rafael Tavares dos Santos (born 26 June 2000) is a Brazilian footballer who plays as a forward or a winger.

Club career

Spartak Trnava
Tavares joined Spartak Trnava on loan in August 2018, initially starting in the U19 youth team. Later on, he broke to the first-team and made his professional Fortuna Liga debut against Dunajská Streda on 23 February 2019, coming on as a stoppage time replacement for a former Slovak international, David Depetris.

Honours 
Spartak Trnava
 Slovnaft Cup: 2018–19

References

External links
 FC Spartak Trnava official club profile 
 
 
 Futbalnet profile 

2000 births
Living people
Brazilian footballers
Brazilian expatriate footballers
Association football midfielders
FC Spartak Trnava players
Slovak Super Liga players
Capivariano Futebol Clube players
MFK Karviná players
Brazilian expatriate sportspeople in Slovakia
Brazilian expatriate sportspeople in the Czech Republic
Expatriate footballers in the Czech Republic
Expatriate footballers in Slovakia